Eric Norman Felton (born October 8, 1955) is a former American football defensive back who played three seasons in the National Football League with the New Orleans Saints and New York Giants. He was drafted by the New Orleans Saints in the fifth round of the 1978 NFL Draft. He played college football at Texas Tech University and attended Lubbock High School in Lubbock, Texas.

References

External links
Just Sports Stats

Living people
1955 births
Players of American football from Austin, Texas
American football defensive backs
African-American players of American football
Texas Tech Red Raiders football players
New Orleans Saints players
New York Giants players
21st-century African-American people
20th-century African-American sportspeople
Lubbock High School alumni